Gyula Gáyer (16 February 1883, in Kiscell, Hungary, Austria-Hungary – 13 June 1932, in Szombathely, Hungary) was a Hungarian botanist, lawyer, and judge.

Biography
Gáyer's early education was at Celldömölk. At the age of ten, he came to Szombathely, where he became a pupil of the Premonstratensian grammar school. He finished high school in Budapest. From 1904, he continued his studies at the university in Cluj-Napoca, where he was called to the bar in 1907. From 1914 onward he was a judge.

Botanical work
He described several species and subspecies, including several subspecies of Aconitum napellus.

Several plants bear his name:

 (Euphorbiaceae) Tithymalus × gayeri (Boros & Soó) Holub
 (Rhamnaceae) Rhamnus × gayeri  ex Soó

References 

1883 births
1932 deaths
People from Celldömölk
20th-century Hungarian botanists
20th-century Hungarian lawyers
Hungarian judges